Marquise Jacari "M. J." Rice is an American college basketball player at the University of Kansas.

Early life and high school
Rice grew up in Durham, North Carolina and initially attended Durham Academy. He tore his ACL as a sophomore. Rice transferred to Oak Hill Academy in Mouth of Wilson, Virginia after his sophomore year. He averaged 19.6 points per game at Oak Hill as a junior before transferring to Prolific Prep in Napa, California before the start of his senior year. Rice averaged 20.1 points, 5.3 rebounds, and 2.3 assists per game during his senior season. He was selected to play in the 2022 McDonald's All-American Boys Game during the season. 

Rice was rated a five-star recruit. He committed to play college basketball at Kansas over offers from Pittsburgh, Oklahoma State, and NC State. Rice also considered playing professionally in the NBA G League.

College career
Rice enrolled at Kansas shortly after graduating high school and took part in the Jayhawks' summer practices. He entered his freshman season as a reserve shooting guard. Rice made his college debut in the second game of the season against North Dakota State, scoring 10 points on 5-10 shooting in a 82-59 win. Rice missed several games in December 2022 and January 2023 due to back spasms.

References

External links
Kansas Jayhawks bio

Living people
African-American basketball players
American men's basketball players
Basketball players from North Carolina
Kansas Jayhawks men's basketball players
Shooting guards
McDonald's High School All-Americans